Colegio Nacional de Buenos Aires (National School of Buenos Aires) is a public high school in Buenos Aires, Argentina, affiliated to the University of Buenos Aires. In the tradition of the European gymnasium it provides a free education that includes classical languages such as Latin and Greek. The school is one of the most prestigious in Latin America.  Its alumni include many personalities, including two Nobel laureates and four Presidents of Argentina.

History 
Its origins date to 1661, when it was known as Colegio Grande de San Carlos, when the colonial government entrusted the Jesuit Order with the education of the youth.  After the Papal suppression of the Jesuits from Spanish Empire-controlled South America in 1767, the institution languished until 1772, when governor Juan José de Vértiz y Salcedo reopened the school as the Real Colegio de San Carlos.  Vértiz, already appointed Viceroy of the Río de la Plata, renamed the school Real Convictorio Carolino in 1783, a name that endured until 1806. Thereafter, the school changed its name and program several times.

President Bartolomé Mitre redesignated the institution as the Colegio Nacional in 1863, and since 1911 the school has been administered by the University of Buenos Aires.  Originally only for men, the school has admitted female students since 1957.

Nowadays, students from the Colegio Nacional de Buenos Aires rank among the best in most science Olympiads, such as the IPhO, IChO and IBO.

Alumni 
Alumni include many of Argentina's founding fathers, Presidents, members of political parties of all ideologies, internationally recognized scientists, artists, and two Nobel laureates. A partial list includes:

Nobel laureates

Politicians and jurists

Heads of State

Other 

 Alberto Manguel – writer, bibliophile, essayist, journalist
 Herman Aguinis – business school professor, researcher, author
 Luis Agote – devised the first effective method of blood transfusion
 Roberto Aizenberg – Surrealist painter
 Miguel Cané – writer, diplomat and lawmaker
 Gregorio de Laferrère – playwright and lawmaker
 Martiniano Molina – chef and elected mayor of Quilmes Partido
 Mario Firmenich – Montoneros guerrilla leader
 Alejandro Korn – philosopher and lawmaker
 Ernesto Jaimovich – politician
 Manuel Mendanha – plastic artist
 Film directors: Manuel Antín (founder of the Universidad del Cine), Fabián Bielinsky, Ana Katz, Nicolas Entel (winner Festival de Cine de La Habana)
 Salvador Mazza – epidemiologist who helped control Chagas disease locally
 Father Carlos Mugica – activist priest, assassinated in 1974
 José Pablo Ventura – student activist, assassinated in 1977
 José Luis Murature – Foreign Minister of Argentina, 1914–1916
 Ignacio Pirovano – surgeon, performed first local laparotomy
 Nicolás Repetto – co-founder of the Socialist Party of Argentina and Cooperative movement leader
 Lalo Schiffrin – composer and pianist, born Boris Claudio Schifrin, Grammy Award winner and Academy Award nominee
 Bernardo Grinspun – economist, Economy Minister (1983–1985)
 Journalists: Pepe Eliaschev (award-winning journalist 1945–2014), Martín Caparrós, Rolando Hanglin, Mario Mactas
 Ana María Shua (Shoua) – writer
 Aníbal Ponce – psychologist and sociologist. 
 Ada María Elflein- Poet
 Alicia Moreau de Justo – political figure, pioneer in women's and human rights.
 Roberto Alemann – lawyer and economist, entrepreneur, antinazi activist, Several times minister of Economy.
 Juan Ernesto Alemann – economist, entrepreneur, antinazi activist, Minister of Economy (1976–1981)
 Mario Roberto Álvarez (1913–2011), architect. He designed the municipal Teatro General San Martín (completed in 1960); the Hernandarias Subfluvial Tunnel (completed in 1969), the Colón Opera House's labyrinthine production facilities (1972), the Buenos Aires headquarters for the state steel concern, Somisa (1977), the Salto Grande Dam (1979) and numerous office buildings.
 Cartoonists: Caloi (creator of Clemente), Nik (creator of Gaturro)
 Julio Montaner – AIDS research pioneer

Facilities

The school offers an astronomy observatory, a swimming pool, a cinema, a sports campus with football, rugby, handball, volleyball, hockey and basketball courts. Free classes are available such as astronomy, photography, languages, sailing, tango, theater, history of cinema, Yoga, piano, chess, band production and martial arts. The sailing team has won many of the local competitions. It also has a choir, which sings in the most important school events.

Enrollment
In accordance with the meritocratic conception of the school, admission is highly competitive. It involves ten exams after a year-long course, testing in language, mathematics, geography, and history. Every year 1,200 candidates apply but only around 400 gain admission. There are about 2,000 students enrolled, who pay no fees since the school is public and therefore free.

See also
 Escuela Superior de Comercio Carlos Pellegrini
 Instituto Libre de Segunda Enseñanza
 List of Jesuit sites

References

University of Buenos Aires
Secondary schools in Argentina
Buildings and structures in Buenos Aires
Educational institutions established in 1863
1863 establishments in Argentina